In mathematics, a vector measure is a function defined on a family of sets and taking vector values satisfying certain properties. It is a generalization of the concept of finite measure, which takes nonnegative real values only.

Definitions and first consequences 

A vector measure  is called countably additive if for any sequence  of disjoint sets in  such that their union is in  it holds that

with the series on the right-hand side convergent in the norm of the Banach space 

It can be proved that an additive vector measure   is countably additive if and only if for any sequence  as above one has

where  is the norm on 

Countably additive vector measures defined on sigma-algebras are more general than finite measures, finite signed measures, and complex measures, which are countably additive functions taking values respectively on the real interval  the set of real numbers, and the set of complex numbers.

Examples 

Consider the field of sets made up of the interval  together with the family  of all Lebesgue measurable sets contained in this interval. For any such set  define

where  is the indicator function of  Depending on where  is declared to take values, two different outcomes are observed.

Both of these statements follow quite easily from the criterion stated above.

The variation of a vector measure

where the supremum is taken over all the partitions

of  into a finite number of disjoint sets, for all  in  Here,  is the norm on 

for any  in  If  is finite, the measure  is said to be of bounded variation. One can prove that if  is a vector measure of bounded variation, then  is countably additive if and only if  is countably additive.

Lyapunov's theorem 

In the theory of vector measures, Lyapunov's theorem states that the range of a (non-atomic) finite-dimensional vector measure is closed and convex.  In fact, the range of a non-atomic vector measure is a zonoid (the closed and convex set that is the limit of a convergent sequence of zonotopes). It is used in economics, in ("bang–bang") control theory, and in statistical theory.
Lyapunov's theorem has been proved by using the Shapley–Folkman lemma, which has been viewed as a discrete analogue of Lyapunov's theorem.

See also

References

Bibliography 

 

 Kluvánek, I., Knowles, G, Vector Measures and Control Systems, North-Holland Mathematics Studies 20, Amsterdam, 1976.
 
 

Control theory
Functional analysis
Measures (measure theory)